David Holland Tomlinson (born May 8, 1969) is a Canadian former professional ice hockey centre. He attended Boston University on a hockey scholarship from 1987-1991. After graduating, he played in the AHL and IHL and also compiled 42 games in the NHL for the Toronto Maple Leafs, Winnipeg Jets and Florida Panthers. He also played for Canada's National Team in various tournaments. After his NHL career, he went on to play 10 years of professional hockey in Europe. He was recently a regular contributor and analyst for TSN Radio 1040 in Vancouver. On July 29, 2010 it was announced that he would replace Tom Larscheid as the colour commentator for Vancouver Canucks radio broadcasts starting from the 2010-2011 season onwards.
In October 2021, Tomlinson was named as the first radio color commentator for the NHL's newest franchise, the Seattle Kraken.

Career statistics

Regular season and playoffs

External links
 

1969 births
Living people
Adler Mannheim players
Boston University Terriers men's ice hockey players
Canadian expatriate ice hockey players in Germany
Canadian ice hockey centres
Canadian radio personalities
Canadian sports announcers
Cincinnati Cyclones (IHL) players
EV Zug players
Florida Panthers players
Hamburg Freezers players
HC Martigny players
Ice hockey people from British Columbia
Krefeld Pinguine players
Moncton Hawks players
National Hockey League broadcasters
National Hockey League supplemental draft picks
Nürnberg Ice Tigers players
Sportspeople from North Vancouver
St. John's Maple Leafs players
Toronto Maple Leafs draft picks
Toronto Maple Leafs players
Vancouver Canucks announcers
Winnipeg Jets (1979–1996) players